Albert Mishake Muyongo (born 28 April 1944) is a Namibian politician and former Member of Parliament who is  living in exile in Denmark.

Muyongo was born into Mafwe Royal House in Linyanti, South West Africa. He received education at the Roman Catholic mission schools at Katima Mulilo in Caprivi and Zimbabwe. He attended South African colleges and taught for several years. In September 1964, Muyongo became the president of the Caprivi African National Union (CANU) when its leader Brendan Simbwaye was detained by the South African Police. Muyongo fled to Zambia shortly after security forces raided the CANU office in Katima Mulilo. While living in exile in Dar es Salaam, Muyongo negotiated a merger with Sam Nujoma's South West Africa People's Organisation (SWAPO) party and served as SWAPO representative to Zambia for two years.

Both parties would fight together to liberate Namibia from South African rule. Muyongo held various positions in SWAPO before he was expelled in 1980: representative in Zambia (1964–1965), educational secretary (1966–1970), SWAPO Vice-President (from 1970).

In 1985, Muyongo led his CANU into a new political party, the United Democratic Party which soon joined the Democratic Turnhalle Alliance (DTA) group of parties but was expelled again in 1998 after rumours of secessionism surfaced. He was a member of the National Assembly from 1990 to 1999. In the 1994 presidential election he placed second, behind President Sam Nujoma, with 23.08% of the vote. After Muyongo expressed support for Caprivi secession in 1998, he was suspended from the DTA in August 1998 at an extraordinary meeting of the party's executive committee. Muyongo fled the country with Chief Boniface Bebi Mamili of the Lozi-allied Mafwe people. Other Caprivians, including the former governor of the Caprivi Region (today Zambezi Region), John Mabuku. fled to Botswana at the same time. Muyongo was replaced as DTA President by Katuutire Kaura, who called for Muyongo to be brought back and put on trial.

Muyongo and Bebi fled and found exile in Denmark and escaped the Caprivi treason trial in Namibia. Purportedly Nujoma had agreed to an independent Caprivi, once SWAPO succeeded in winning Namibian independence. This 'agreement', however, was never fulfilled.

References

External links
 Reprint of "Namibian Voters Deny Total Power to SWAPO" by Michael Johns, The Wall Street Journal, 19 November 1989.

1944 births
Living people
Members of the National Assembly (Namibia)
Popular Democratic Movement politicians
Members of SWAPO
People from Zambezi Region
Namibian expatriates in Zambia
Namibian expatriates in Tanzania
Namibian expatriates in Denmark
Namibian exiles
Candidates for President of Namibia